History of Cinema is a 2008 Iranian Irish experimental short film directed by Rouzbeh Rashidi. The film is an experimental derivation from the concept of cinema, expressing this perception through images and sound. The 33 minute film reflects the notion of seventh art with complete personal and free interpretation.

Production
Rashidi shot the film with webcam and mobile phone cameras between 2002 and 2004. Each segment of the film was shot and edited separately, and compiled together in 2008 for the final version. Rashidi used archival footage from the early films of cinema and integrated them with the rest of material in order to create the sense of history. The film is heavily saturated, grainy and full of distorted images. The soundscape designed by Rashidi was added into the film with chosen music.

Reception
History of Cinema premiered at the Global Cinema Festival 2009 in India.

Lucca Film Festival 2010 - (An)Other Irish Cinema Category

External links

History of Cinema on Mubi (website)

References

English-language Iranian films
English-language Irish films
2000s avant-garde and experimental films
Iranian black-and-white films
Irish black-and-white films
Films set in Iran
Films set in Ireland
Iranian avant-garde and experimental films
Irish avant-garde and experimental films
Mobile phone films
2009 short films
2009 films
2000s English-language films